The men's shot put at the 1969 European Athletics Championships was held in Athens, Greece, at Georgios Karaiskakis Stadium on 17 and 18 September 1969.

Medalists

Results

Final
18 September

Qualification
17 September

Participation
According to an unofficial count, 22 athletes from 13 countries participated in the event.

 (1)
 (1)
 (3)
 (2)
 (3)
 (1)
 (2)
 (1)
 (1)
 (2)
 (3)
 (1)
 (1)

References

Shot put
Shot put at the European Athletics Championships